Jesus Christ Superstar is a musical by Tim Rice and Andrew Lloyd Webber, the title may also refer to:

Uses related to the above stage musical:
Jesus Christ Superstar (album), the original album that led to all further musical productions including the above stage musical
 Cast recordings:
Jesus Christ Superstar (Original Australian Cast Recording)
Jesus Christ Superstar (1972 Swedish cast)
Jesus Christ Superstar (1996 London Cast), Andrew Lloyd Webber's revival version
Jesus Christ Superstar (film), 1973 American film adaptation, directed by Norman Jewison, or the 2000 remake of it, directed by Gale Edwards
Jesus Christ Superstar (film soundtrack), the soundtrack to the 1973 film
Jesus Christ Superstar Live in Concert, 2018 American live television adaptation

Other uses
Jesus Christ Superstars, an album by Laibach

See also

 Superstar (Jesus Christ Superstar song), the title song and final musical number from Jesus Christ Superstar, and a hit single for several artists